Waverly is the largest village in Tioga County, New York, United States. According to the 2010 U.S. Census, Waverly had a population of 4,177. It is located southeast of Elmira in the Southern Tier region. This village was incorporated as the southwest part of the town of Barton in 1854. The village name is attributed to Joseph "Uncle Joe" Hallett, founder of its first Fire Department and pillar of the community, who conceived the name by dropping the second "e" from the name of his favorite author's novel, Waverley by Sir Walter Scott. The former village hall is listed on the National Historic Places list.

Waverly is part of the Binghamton Metropolitan Statistical Area. The village, formerly less of a backwater as one regular stop of the Black Diamond Express passenger service, is also in a mid-sized rust belt community known as the Penn-York Valley, once a thriving railroad company town spanning counties in cross border Pennsylvania as well — a group of four contiguous communities in New York and Pennsylvania:  Waverly, NY; South Waverly, PA; Sayre, PA, and Athens, PA — with Waverly part of one continuous Susquehanna valley bounded strip city, with a combined population near 30,000. As of the 2010 Census, the village had a total population of 4,444. 
 
 
 

In May 1870, a Waverly banker named Howard Elmer, along with Charles Anthony and James Fritcher, bought the Pine Plains area between Waverly and Athens.  Elmer convinced Asa Packer to locate a new railroad repair facility on the Pine Plains for the expanding Lehigh Valley Railroad, which was making a push north from Duryea at the Lackawanna to connect to the Erie Railroad at Waverly to achieve a market share in the much coveted New York City-Great Lakes sweepstakes.  Robert Heysham Sayre, president of the Pennsylvania and New York Railroad, helped cement the deal. The town was named in his honor. Sayre was incorporated on January 27, 1891.  The town would become famous for its extensive rail yard (still appreciably large today at half the peak size) and more famous for the railroad repair shops and steam locomotive repair and manufacturing shops situated in the town, which employed thousands.
 
In 1904, when the locomotive shops were built at Sayre, the main shop building was believed to be the largest structure in the world under one roof, but held that title for only a brief time. The railroad founded as a coal rail road in 1855 to connect the Coal Region operated through traffic up the Susquehanna to Elmira and points north and west from 1870 until 1976, but maintenance facilities were shifted away before that with the switch away from anthracite steam locomotives to diesels post-World War II. With the decline of the railway industry, supporting industries and business has also declined along with valley jobs, so the population has declined since 1940, the railroad dependent rust belt towns beginning the process sooner because of dieselization of railroads.

The greater town is located in a river valley in the Allegheny Plateau just north of the confluence of the Susquehanna and  Chemung rivers, along with Athens, Pennsylvania, South Waverly, Pennsylvania, and Waverly, New York. Together, these small towns make up the greater area known as the Penn-York Valley, or just "the Valley". The New York / Pennsylvania border cuts through the valley. There is no physical border between the towns, as the grid of streets and avenues blend seamlessly from one town to another.

History
In earlier times, this territory was a prime location for Native American travel, trade, and warfare because it is strategically situated atop a valley surrounding the confluence of two rivers along the New York state border where the mouth of the Chemung River empties into the Susquehanna River as it turns southward into Pennsylvania. This locale was likely occupied by the Susquehannock people for several centuries before European pathfinders discovered this place. French explorer Étienne Brûlé was probably the first European to visit the area, meeting with the Susquehannocks and travelling down the Susquehanna River in 1615. In the wake of the Beaver Wars of the mid-Seventeenth Century, the area came firmly under the control of the Iroquois, until the Sullivan Expedition during the American Revolutionary War broke their power.

John Shepard was one of the more prominent early white settlers, buying , including all of what would become Waverly, and building a mill on the banks of Cayuta Creek in 1796. The settlement would soon become known as Milltown, just across the border in Pennsylvania. A second mill site on the creek north of the border would soon be known as Factoryville, now East Waverly. An adjacent smaller community named Villemont also became established.

At the beginning of the railroad age the community began to thrive. From 1849–51, the New York & Erie Railroad reached the vicinity, opening a rail connection eastward to New York City via Binghamton, and westward to Lake Erie via Elmira. Soon after, in 1854, Waverly became an incorporated village. Waverly become an important railroad junction in 1869 when construction of the Lehigh Valley Railroad from Wilkes-Barre, PA reached northward to this village on the New York State line and increased its viability by effectively linking both railway operations. This also helped spur the economic development of Sayre, Pennsylvania, Waverly's southern neighbor and former home to Lehigh Valley Railroad's locomotive yard and shops. At the height of the railroad age, approximately forty one trains entered the village per day and the population of the village was nearly triple what it is today. During this time, the largest celebration in the village was held: the August, 26th 1910 Old Home Celebration which lasted four hours and packed the streets with spectators.

Several factories of historical significance contributed to a flourishing period in Waverly's development. They included the Hall-Lyons furniture factory which was located on Broad Street and the Manoil Manufacturing Co. whose prominence as a toy company, especially from 1937-1941 when it produced hollow-cast toy soldiers (sometimes called dime store soldiers) along with toy airplanes and cars, was located on Providence Street. Businesses in and around Waverly in the twentieth century included the Spencer Glove Company and the Waverly Sun newspaper, both owned by Hart I. Seely and located in Waverly; the Tioga Mills, Inc., a feed mill company and Agway (Country Foods Division) of Syracuse, New York, as a pet food plant. Others are the Food and Drug Research Laboratories, the State Line Auto Auction and O’Brien's Inn, known for its scenic view of the Chemung Valley. The J.E. Rodeo Ranch operated during the 1940s and 1950s in Barton.

The Grace Episcopal Church, United States Post Office, Waverly Village Hall, and former Mary W. Muldoon High School are listed on the National Register of Historic Places.

See Barton, New York for information on the J.E. Rodeo Ranch, and Ashland, New York for information on the Battle of Newtown.

Geography
Waverly is located at  (42.005247, -76.537892).

According to the United States Census Bureau, the village has a total area of 2.3 square miles (6.1 km2), of which 2.3 square miles (5.9 km2)  is land and 0.1 square mile (0.1 km2)  is water. The total area is 2.14% water.

Another Susquehanna tributary, Cayuta Creek, also known locally as Shepard's Creek, flows through the eastern part of the village before joining the Susquehanna in Sayre, Pennsylvania.

Waverly is so close to New York State's southern border that the village is part of a much larger community that runs into Bradford County, Pennsylvania. Waverly combines with South Waverly, Sayre and Athens, Pennsylvania to make up the larger community of the Penn-York Valley or simply "The Valley", which  has a state border running through it. Waverly is also a short distance from the border of Chemung County to the west.

Demographics

As of the census of 2000, there were 4,607 people, 1,877 households, and 1,128 families residing in the village. The population density was 2,013.3 people per square mile (776.8/km2). There were 2,052 housing units at an average density of 896.7 per square mile (346.0/km2). The racial makeup of the village was 97.63% White, 0.63% African American, 0.24% Native American, 0.50% Asian, 0.00% Pacific Islander, 0.30% from other races, and 0.69% from two or more races. 1.24% of the population were Hispanic or Latino of any race.

There were 1,877 households, out of which 30.4% had children under the age of 18 living with them, 43.0% were married couples living together, 13.3% had a female householder with no husband present, and 39.9% were non-families. 33.7% of all households were made up of individuals, and 16.3% had someone living alone who was 65 years of age or older. The average household size was 2.32 and the average family size was 2.98.

In the village, the population was spread out, with 24.0% under the age of 18, 8.1% from 18 to 24, 27.2% from 25 to 44, 20.3% from 45 to 64, and 20.4% who were 65 years of age or older. The median age was 39 years. For every 100 females, there were 84.1 males. For every 100 females age 18 and over, there were 78.8 males.

The median income for a household in the village was $28,958, and the median income for a family was $39,522. Males had a median income of $31,544 versus $24,492 for females. The per capita income for the village was $14,945. 13.3% of the population and 9.5% of families were below the poverty line. 18.3% of those under the age of 18 and 5.6% of those 65 and older were living below the poverty line.

Education
The following primary and secondary schools comprise the Waverly Central School District:

 Primary schools
 Elm Street Elementary School
 Lincoln Street Elementary School
 Chemung Elementary School
 Secondary schools
 Waverly High School
 Waverly Middle School
 Religious schools
Zion Ministerial Institute
 Higher education
Broome Community College (Ithaca Street campus)
 Museums
SRAC (Susquehanna River Archeological Center)
The archaeological center opened in 2008 dedicated to education, research and preservation of the region's Native American archaeological, cultural and historical assets for the communities within the Twin Tiers Region of Southeastern NY and Northeastern PA. The center holds a gift shop, Lecture hall, and Exhibit hall all located on Broad Street, downtown.

Transportation
Downtown Waverly spans along an area adjacent to and immediately north of the Southern Tier Expressway, New York State Route 17, which will be redesignated as Interstate 86 as upgrades proceed along the route. Access to NY 17 is available at both eastern and western points of the village. New York State Route 17C and New York State Route 34 also intersect in the eastern end of this village. In addition, the northern terminus for U.S. Route 220 is at NY 17C (Chemung Street) in the west end of the village along the state border.

Waverly has two local bus services, Ride Tioga and BeST Transit. Ride Tioga is a county-run bus service that stops throughout Waverly and Barton. BeST Transit service makes stops in the Penn-York Valley and Bradford County, Pennsylvania as well as the Lycoming Mall. Shortline Coach USA and Greyhound regional bus services stop in Waverly, as well. The village also has taxi service available through Valley Taxi Service which travels throughout the vicinities of the Penn-York Valley, Elmira Towanda, and Binghamton. Waverly is also conveniently located between the Elmira-Corning Regional Airport in the Town of Big Flats and the Greater Binghamton Airport located in Maine, New York, both of which are medium-sized regional airports serving the Southern Tier of New York.

Media

Newspaper
 Morning Times (based in Sayre; serves Waverly, Sayre, Athens and surrounding communities)
 The Daily Review (based in Towanda; serves the Penn-York Valley and Bradford County)
 Star Gazette (based in Elmira; serves Tioga, Chemung and Steuben Counties in NY and Bradford County in PA)

Radio
 WAVR - 102.1 FM (based in Sayre; licensed in Waverly for FM broadcasting)
 WATS - 960 AM (based in Sayre; licensed in Sayre for AM broadcasting)
 WCIH - 94.3 FM (based in Elmira; licensed in Elmira for FM broadcasting)
 WEBO - 1330 AM (based in Owego; branded to Waverly for AM broadcasting)
 WENI-FM - 92.7 FM (based in Elmira; licensed in S. Waverly for FM broadcasting)
 W297BG - 107.3 FM (licensed in Ulster, Pennsylvania; KZ FM)

Television

Waverly is served by many local television stations, in two broadcast television markets, along with Time Warner Cable News.
 Binghamton: WBNG CBS; WIVT ABC; WBGH NBC; WICZ Fox; and WSKG Public Television
 Elmira: WETM NBC; WENY ABC & CBS; and WYDC Fox

Sports
Waverly was once home to a professional baseball team in 1901, as the Waverly Wagonmakers. The team went under when the New York State League was dissolved in 1917. Waverly is also home to the Waverly Little League, it was founded in 1949. The Waverly School District also has football, baseball, basketball, bowling, golf, tennis, soccer, wrestling, track, and cross country, teams. Waverly's wrestling and track teams achieve consistent state and national rankings. Waverly is also home to many smaller bowling leagues that have matches at the Valley Bowling Center in Waverly. Waverly Memorial Stadium is located in Waverly. Soccer and Football are played at the stadium.

Notable people

 J. Weston Allen - politician
 Linda Bangs - saxophonist
 Jeffrey L. Barnhart - member of the North Carolina General Assembly
 Geoff Bodine - professional NASCAR race car driver, inventor of the Bo-Dyn Bobsled, a graduate of Waverly High School
 Brett Bodine - professional NASCAR race car driver, graduate of Waverly High School
 Todd Bodine - professional NASCAR race car driver, graduate of Waverly High School
 Lauren Cohen - economist
 Charles Martin Crandall - inventor and toy-maker
 Christopher Erb - marketing executive 
 Jim Farr - pro-baseball player
 Jeff Foote - NBA player
 Les Goble - American football player
 William Elting Johnson - physician and politician
 Cabot Lyford – sculptor raised in Waverly
 Bernard L. Oser - Columbia University professor, formerly researched at Food and Drug Research Laboratories, Inc. in Waverly
 Harriet Newell Ralston (1828-1920), American poet
 Miriam Shearing - lawyer and retired judge
 Heinie Wagner - baseball player, began career with the Waverly Wagonmakers in the New York State League

Recent events

 Two Rivers State Park
In 2005, a  parcel of scenic woodlands, surrounding the Waverly Reservoir property and encompassing Waverly Glen park, was designated as Two Rivers State Park for its location just north of the confluence of the Chemung River along the western edge of the village and the Susquehanna River to the south of the village. Hiking and biking trails may be available, as well as a large pond, picnic tables, a basketball court, two tennis courts, children's gym equipment, covered pavilions, water taps and barbecue fireplaces. The sign at the entrance is gone. Directly south of the park, I86 (Rte 17) briefly enters Pennsylvania before re-entering New York State.
 Tioga Downs Horse Racing
In 2006, the horse racing track at Tioga Downs in neighboring Nichols NY, was expanded to include a Racino with the addition of casino facilities. State funding was secured for this facility, including $1,000,000 for the construction of a waste water treatment plant.
 Historical Downtown Preservation
A large portion of the former Snyder Hotel building in downtown Waverly collapsed during a severe weather storm in the summer of 2007, requiring emergency efforts to clear fallen bricks, wood and other building products and restore the safety of downtown operations. Concerns regarding safety remain with some of the historic buildings along Broad Street. Decisions remain as to whether to tear down or renovate these buildings. Waverly sought financial assistance under the state's Restore New York funding program, but was unable to secure any. A tax increase referendum conducted 11 December 2008 resulted in voter approval to secure financing for what has subsequently led to the purchase and relocation of all village municipal services to the former Ithaca Street School, after outgrowing the available space at the historic Waverly Village Hall. On 14 February 2012, the Village of Waverly Trustees accepted a purchase offer for the former Village Hall building by a potential owner, who has agreed to abide by the New York State Historic Preservation Office regulations for its historical preservation.

Manufacturers
 Advanced Drainage Systems, Inc. (formerly Hancor, Inc.) - Located at 1 William Donnelly Industrial Parkway, Advanced Drainage Systems manufactures corrugated plastic drainage pipe made from high-density polyethylene (HDPE).
 Granite Works, LLC- Located at 133 William Donnelly Industrial Parkway, the company fabricates granite, quartz and solid surface countertops using supplies from international locations such as Brazil, Italy and China.
 Hagen Pet Foods, Inc - Located at 702 Broad Street Extension, Hagen manufactures and wholesales pet foods such as milk, dry food, moist food and treats or snacks for both dogs and cats, as well as animal feed and rodent food.
 Leprino Foods Company - located at 400 Leprino Avenue, Leprino manufactures mozzarella cheese produced from milk provided by local dairy farms. This cheese factory is the largest employer in Waverly, and currently, the largest supplier of cheese for pizza chains in the eastern United States. The New York/Pennsylvania state line runs through the middle of the plant. Its parent company is also a leading U.S. manufacturer and exporter of sweet whey, whey protein and lactose products and is the world's largest manufacturer of mozzarella and pizza cheese.
 Rynone Manufacturing Corp. - With facilities located at 229 Howard Street, 410 Spaulding Street and 9-11 Route 34, Rynone manufactures cultured marble vanity tops, natural granite and marble vanity tops, laminate countertops, granite countertops and casework.

References

External links

 Village of Waverly
 Tioga County Historical Society; 20th Century
 Brief description Waverly/Barton
 Tioga County Historical Society Museum and Library

Villages in Tioga County, New York
Binghamton metropolitan area
Populated places established in 1854
1854 establishments in New York (state)
Villages in New York (state)